The Kerala Sahitya Akademi Award for Translation is an award given every year by the Kerala Sahitya Akademi (Kerala Literary Academy) to writers for translating a work from a foreign language to Malayalam. It is one of the twelve categories of the Kerala Sahitya Akademi Award.

Awardees

References

Awards established in 1992
Kerala Sahitya Akademi Awards
Malayalam literary awards
Translation awards
1992 establishments in Kerala